The Society of Diagnostic Medical Sonography (SDMS) is the largest professional association for sonographers in the world, and hosts the largest annual conference for sonographers. SDMS publishes a bi-monthly journal, the Journal of Diagnostic Medical Sonography. The association also supports a broad advocacy program supporting legislative and regulatory initiatives designed to support sonographers and quality control standards for sonography services provided to patients by the SDMS membership. The SDMS publishes resources related to the practice of diagnostic medical sonography, including the Scope of Practice and Clinical Standards for the Diagnostic Medical Sonographer and the Industry Standards for the Prevention of Work Related Musculoskeletal Disorders in Sonography.

The SDMS is a nonprofit, professional association representing over 27,500 sonographers and sonography student members. SDMS members can be found in all fifty U.S. states and forty-eight countries. The SDMS provides its membership with a comprehensive array of continuing medical education activities, information, and products reflecting all of the sonography specialty areas including:
 Abdominal Sonography
 Adult Cardiac Sonography
 Breast Sonography
 Fetal Cardiac Sonography
 Musculoskeletal
 Neurosonology
 OB/Gyn Sonography
 Pediatric Cardiac Sonography
 Physician Vascular Interpretation
 Vascular Sonography
 Veterinary Sonography
The SDMS was incorporated in 1970 in the State of Washington and is registered with the Texas Secretary of State as a foreign corporation operating in Plano, Texas. The SDMS is recognized by the US Internal Revenue Service as an exempt organization under Internal Revenue Code (IRC) Section 501(c)(6). The SDMS is affiliated with another nonprofit organizations - the SDMS Foundation, which is recognized by the US Internal Revenue Service as an exempt organization under Internal Revenue Code (IRC) Section 501(c)(3) as a public charity (offering grants, scholarships, education, research, and international assistance programs).

References

External links
 Society of Diagnostic Medical Sonography
 Society of Diagnostic Medical Sonography Foundation
 Journal of Diagnostic Medical Sonography

International medical and health organizations
Medical imaging organizations
Medical ultrasonography
501(c)(6) nonprofit organizations